Marshal Tito's Spirit is a 1999 Croatian film directed by Vinko Brešan. It was Croatia's submission to the 73rd Academy Awards for the Academy Award for Best Foreign Language Film, but was not accepted as a nominee.

Synopsis 
The film centers on the Croatian island of Vis in 1998. During the funeral of a local Yugoslav Partisan veteran, his elderly comrades start seeing the ghost of Marshal Josip Broz Tito. After rumours about the apparition spread around, a Split-based policeman who goes by the name Stipan is ordered to investigate the suspicious movements of  members in his hometown, a remote Adriatic island whose only connection with the mainland is a ferry that comes around once a week.

Stipan's investigation goes awry, because the leader of former local fighters, Marinko Čičin, considers him a traitor to socialism and a collaborator with the enemy, while locals only speculate of what happened. Stipan learns about the comrade Tito's ghost from a middle-aged married couple of painters from Zagreb who are looking for inspiration on the island. After a week of investigation, Stipan returns to Split on a ferry together with a large group of locals. The Split mayor Luka, who had previously privatized all state objects in the town, smells a business opportunity and begins organizing communist-era events to attract tourism (May Day parades, Relay of Youth, etc.) and maximise profits. Local Partisan veterans of the 7th Dalmatian Brigade led by Marinko decide to take arms and control the town, turning it into the communist-era shape. The island becomes a pilgrimage destination for retired fighters, who come in droves from the mainland to the island in belief that the time has come for the return of socialism.

Cast 

 Dražen Kühn as Stipan
 Linda Begonja as Slavica
 Ilija Ivezić as Marinko Cicin
 Ivo Gregurević as Luka
 Boris Buzančić as Jakov
 Ljubo Kapor as Bura
 Inge Appelt as Mare
 Bojan Navojec as Miuko
 Predrag Vušović as Toni
 Boris Svrstan as Lijan Mulderić
 Ksenija Pajić as Danica Skulić

Awards and nominations
The film received 3 nominations and won 9 awards at various international film festivals. Among them, Vinko Brešan won the Best Director Award at the 36th Karlovy Vary International Film Festival.

See also

Cinema of Croatia
List of submissions to the 73rd Academy Awards for Best Foreign Language Film

References

External links

1999 films
1999 comedy films
1990s political comedy films
Croatian comedy films
Films set on islands
Films set in the Mediterranean Sea
Cultural depictions of Josip Broz Tito